Mecodema jacinda is a large-bodied ground beetle endemic to Maungatautari Sanctuary, Waikato, New Zealand. It is the largest species of Mecodema found on Maungatautari, which also has the medium-sized M. curvidens inhabiting the forest. It is named after New Zealand Prime Minister Jacinda Ardern.

Diagnosis 
Differing from all other North Island Mecodema species by:

 vertex smooth, vertexal groove defined by a few obsolescent punctures; 
 the pronotal carina broad the entire length with 8–12 setae each side; 
 interval 7 strongly convex in apical ⅓ (very distinctive); 
 the shape of the apical portion of the penis lobe.

Description 
Length 29–36 mm, pronotal width 7.9–10.2 mm, elytral width 9.1–11.6 mm. Colour of entire body matte to glossy black (especially pronotum).

Natural history 
Relatively common and can be found under logs and rocks in native forest.

References 

jacinda
Beetles described in 2019
Beetles of New Zealand
Endemic fauna of New Zealand
Jacinda Ardern
Endemic insects of New Zealand